The 22413/22414 Madgaon Rajdhani Express is an express train of Rajdhani class belonging to Indian Railways connecting the national capital New Delhi to Madgaon, in the state of Goa. It was introduced on 15 November 2015 and runs twice a week between Madgaon Junction and Hazrat Nizamuddin.

References

Transport in Margao
Transport in Delhi
Rajdhani Express trains
Konkan Railway
Rail transport in Goa
Rail transport in Delhi
Rail transport in Maharashtra
Rail transport in Gujarat
Rail transport in Rajasthan
Railway services introduced in 2015